Bar Kaev District  (also transliterated Bar Keo) is a district in north-eastern Cambodia, located in Ratanakiri Province, 
Population 11,758 (1998). It contains six communes.

References

Districts of Ratanakiri province